Rawlson O'Neil King is a Canadian politician, who was elected to Ottawa City Council in a by-election on April 15, 2019 and re-elected October 24, 2022. King is the city's first-ever Black Canadian city councillor.

Background
King was born and raised in Toronto and educated at Bayview Glen School. His parents were teachers from Saint Vincent and the Grenadines, and his father was born in Aruba.  King holds both a combined bachelor of journalism with legal studies and a M.A. in communication from Carleton University.

King was a long time community volunteer, who served as president of the Overbrook Community Association, a board member at the Rideau-Rockcliffe Community Resource Centre, and co-chair of the Ottawa Police Service Community Equity Council before his election to Council. Recognized for his volunteer work, he won a United Way Ottawa Community Builder of the Year Award in 2018.

Politics

King succeeded Tobi Nussbaum as councillor for Rideau-Rockcliffe Ward in the 2019 Rideau-Rockcliffe municipal by-election. King had previously run in Rideau-Rockcliffe in the 2010 municipal election and ran for a trustee seat on the Ottawa-Carleton District School Board in the 2018 municipal election. He was unsuccessful on both occasions.

In his successful by-election bid, King was endorsed by a number of high-profile progressives in Ottawa. Once elected, King identified his priorities as developing a poverty reduction strategy for impoverished neighbourhoods; working to improve roads, public transit and social services; and improving the relationship of people of colour with the police.

During his first term, King served as Chair of the Built Heritage Sub-Committee and on the Standing Committee on Environmental Protection, Water and Waste Management. He also served on the boards of Crime Prevention Ottawa, Ottawa Community Housing Corporation, Ottawa Community Lands Development Corporation and Quartier Vanier BIA. He was formerly on the Ottawa Police Services Board, before resigning in protest following the removal of board chair Diane Deans in the wake of Ottawa "Freedom Convoy".

To advance anti-racism and race relations initiatives in 2020, King was appointed Council Liaison for Anti-Racism and Ethnocultural Relations Initiatives, where he was successful in establishing an anti-racism office and the city's first anti-racism strategy.

He was re-elected in a landslide victory in 2022 with over 80 percent of the popular vote in a four-person field and a 72 percent margin of victory.

Electoral record

2022 Ottawa municipal election

|-
! rowspan="2" colspan="2"|Candidate
! colspan="3"|Popular vote
! rowspan="2" colspan="2"|Expenditures
|-
! Votes
! %
! ±%
|-
| style="background-color:#F9E300;" |
| style="text-align:left;"  | Rawlson King (X)
| style="text-align:right;" | 8,481
| style="text-align:right;" | 80.14
| style="text-align:right;" | +61.78
| style="text-align:right;" |
|-
| style="background-color:#0d2123;" |
| style="text-align:left;"  | Clayton Fitzsimmons
| style="text-align:right;" | 859
| style="text-align:right;" | 8.12
| style="text-align:right;" |
| style="text-align:right;" |
|-
| style="background-color:#cc6611;" |
| style="text-align:left;"  | Peter Jan Karwacki
| style="text-align:right;" | 716
| style="text-align:right;" | 6.77
| style="text-align:right;" | +6.19
| style="text-align:right;" |
|-
| style="background-color:#212121;" |
| style="text-align:left;"  | Peter Zanette
| style="text-align:right;" | 527
| style="text-align:right;" | 4.98
| style="text-align:right;" |
| style="text-align:right;" |
|-
| style="text-align:right;background-color:#FFFFFF;" colspan="2" |Total valid votes
| style="text-align:right;background-color:#FFFFFF;" | 10,583
| style="text-align:right;background-color:#FFFFFF;" | 94.36
| style="text-align:right;background-color:#c2c2c2;" colspan="2" |
|-
| style="text-align:right;background-color:#FFFFFF;" colspan="2" |Total rejected, unmarked and declined votes
| style="text-align:right;background-color:#FFFFFF;" | 633
| style="text-align:right;background-color:#FFFFFF;" | 5.64
| style="text-align:right;background-color:#c2c2c2;" colspan="2" |
|-
| style="text-align:right;background-color:#FFFFFF;" colspan="2" |Turnout
| style="text-align:right;background-color:#FFFFFF;" | 11,216
| style="text-align:right;background-color:#FFFFFF;" | 39.74
| style="text-align:right;background-color:#FFFFFF;" | +2.59
| style="text-align:right;background-color:#c2c2c2;" |
|-
| style="text-align:right;background-color:#FFFFFF;" colspan="2" |Eligible voters
| style="text-align:right;background-color:#FFFFFF;" | 28,220
| style="text-align:right;background-color:#c2c2c2;" colspan="3" |
|-
| style="text-align:left;" colspan="6" |Note: Candidate campaign colours are based on the prominent colour used in campaign items (signs, literature, etc.)and are used as a visual differentiation between candidates.
|}

2019 Rideau-Rockcliffe by-election

2018 Ottawa municipal election

2010 Ottawa municipal election

References 

Living people
Black Canadian politicians
Ottawa city councillors
Politicians from Toronto
Canadian people of Saint Vincent and the Grenadines descent
People of Aruban descent
Year of birth missing (living people)